Skeleton of Mrs. Morales (Spanish: El Esqueleto de la señora Morales) is a 1960 Mexican black comedy film based on Arthur Machen’s 1927 short story "The Islington Mystery". It is regarded by critics as one of the hundred best Mexican films of all time.

Plot
Pablo Morales (Arturo de Córdova) is a cheerful taxidermist, who lives with his bitter, crippled, obsessive, and extremely religious wife Gloria (Amparo Rivelles). Pablo wants to have children, but Gloria does not. Gloria constantly rebuffs his amorous advances, and constantly belittles him by telling him that he stinks of dead animals. Her primary reason for existence seems to be maliciously annoying her husband.
Pablo has been saving money to buy a camera, but Gloria takes the money Pablo was saving and gives it to the church, leading to conflict with the local priest. Gloria falsely accuses Pablo of drunkenness and abuse. Pablo gets his camera, but Gloria maliciously breaks it, which proves to be the straw that breaks the camel's back.
Pablo takes his revenge by poisoning her. He then dissects Gloria's body and places her skeleton in the front window of his shop. The police and local priest become suspicious and he is put on trial, but he manages to escape man's justice (but not God's).

Cast
 Arturo de Córdova — Dr. Pablo Morales
 Amparo Rivelles — Gloria de Morales
 Elda Peralta
  — Profesor
 Rosenda Monteros — Meche
  — Elodio
  — Lourditas Mendiolea
 Antonio Bravo — Padre Artemio Familiar
 Angelines Fernández — Clara, sister of Gloria

Production
Arthur Machen's original 1927 essay, "The Islington Mystery", which can be found in his collection The Cosy Room, was based largely on the case of the famous murderer Dr. Crippen. Screenwriter Luis Alcoriza was influenced by his association with Luis Buñuel.

Reception
This film is ranked 19 in the list of the 100 best films of Mexican cinema, in the opinion of 25 film critics and experts on Mexico, published by the magazine Somos in July 1994.

References

External links
 

Mexican black comedy films
1960 films
1960s black comedy films
1960s Spanish-language films
Films directed by Rogelio A. González
Films based on short fiction
Uxoricide in fiction
1960 comedy films
1960 drama films
1960s Mexican films